Beverley Mahood (born 2 November 1974) is a country music singer-songwriter and television host in Canada. Beverley emigrated from Belfast to Canada as a child. She is also formerly part of the all-female trio Lace, produced by the renowned Los Angeles producer, David Foster. From 2004 to 2005, she co-hosted the Citytv Vancouver morning show, Breakfast Television. Mahood was then named to co-host CMT Canada's flagship show, CMT Central. She starred as the anchor judge on the series "CMT Chevy Karaoke Star."  Other hosting duties have included the reality series Project Mom/Project Dad and Pick a Puppy (2010–2013) and the countdown program Ultimate.

Mahood established a business partnership in 2005 with Canadian entrepreneur W. Brett Wilson in forming BPM Entertainment Corp. to pursue creative investment opportunities in the entertainment world. She bought out his interest in BPMEC in 2012 and has continued to grow her entertainment business. Mahood attended Saunders High School in London.

Biography

Music career
Mahood has been building her profile in the music scene throughout Canada and the United States since her debut album, Girl Out of the Ordinary, was released in 1998. The album garnered multiple radio singles and music videos. She signed with 143 Records, a record label owned by record producer David Foster. With Foster, she was part of the female trio, Lace, releasing an album, Lace, in 1999. The first single, "I Want a Man", went to number 7 on the charts in Canada and was a number one video on CMT's Chevy Top 20. A second solo CD, Moody Blue, was released in 2004, receiving recognition with another number one CMT video for the single "The First Day You Wake Up Alone."

In addition to her own recorded material, Mahood co-wrote the hit single "Come to Me," recorded by Celine Dion on her 2005 Miracle album. She also wrote "Good to Be Alive," the theme for the CMT reality series' Project Mother and Project Dad, which was released to radio in 2007 with an accompanying music video airing on CMT. In May 2008, Mahood marked her return as a recording artist with the release of the song, "This Girl." A second single, "Rewrite History," was released in October 2008. Mahood's new album, Unmistakable, was released on 18 November 2008. Her most recent Christmas album, This Christmas Celebrate Me Home, was on 4 November 2008. In May 2013, Mahood released a new single, "Hope & Gasoline," to Canadian country radio.  Mahood's fourth album was released on 12 November 2013. The album was re-released in 2017 as "New Religion" with extra tracks

Mahood is also known for being an enthusiastic Toronto Maple Leafs fan. She has sung the national anthems at numerous home games for both the Leafs and the Nashville Predators.

Acting career
In 2006, Mahood contributed her name and image to the Bootlegger Jean print campaign with her image appearing in stores across North America. As an actress, she has performed in The Vagina Monologues (2004), the stage production Heartthrobs (2003) and Castle Rocks (Young People's Theatre, 1998).

She performed in the 2004 television film Chicks with Sticks. Mahood was cast to be the singing superheroine Dazzler in X-Men: The Last Stand (2006). However, she did not shoot any scenes as her character (and many others) were cut from the film.

Charity work
Mahood has and continues to host the Kinsmen Telemiracle in Saskatchewan annually each March, with 2020 being the 23rd year that she has done so. As the host of the Saskatchewan-based telethon, Mahood performs and sings, as well as introducing talent and speaking with various people who have raised funds.

She also performed at The Bohemian Ball in Toronto on 20 February 2009. The 2009 Bohemian Ball, organised by the Canada Czech Republic Chamber of Commerce, was held in support of the SickKids Foundation and the Hospital for Sick Children.

Mahood is a supporter of the following initiatives: the Juvenile Diabetes Research Foundation, the Alberta's Children's Hospital, the David Foster Foundation and the CIBC Run for the Cure. She is also the spokesperson for the Pink Mitten Campaign, which raises money for breast cancer research, education and awareness programs.

Discography

Albums

Singles

As a featured artist

Music videos

Awards 
CCMA Independent Female Artist – 2004, 1999, 1998
CMT Independent Recording Artist of the Year, 1997
Ontario Country Music Association: Rising Star, Female Vocalist, Group or Duo, Single, 1998
RPM Big Country Awards: Rising Star 1998
RPM Big Country Awards: Group of The Year (with Lace) 1999
OCPHA: Group of the Year (with Lace) – 2002, 2000
OCPHA: Vocal Collaboration (with Steve Fox – Couple on the Cake) 2002

References

External links
 Beverley Mahood Official site
 Beverley Mahood's MySpace

1974 births
Living people
Canadian women country singers
Canadian country singer-songwriters
Canadian television hosts
Musicians from Belfast
Musicians from London, Ontario
Northern Ireland emigrants to Canada
21st-century Canadian women singers
Canadian women television hosts